Hormone or Hormones may refer to:

 Hormone, a chemical that sends messages in a plant or animal
 "Hormone", the NATO reporting name for the Soviet/Russian Kamov Ka-25 military helicopter
 Hormones (film), a 2008 Thai film
 Hormones: The Series, a 2013-2015 Thai television series
 Hormones, a medical journal now named Hormone Research in Paediatrics